Josiah "Jossi" Wells (born 18 May 1990) is a freestyle skier who represented New Zealand at the 2014 Winter Olympics in Sochi, Russia.

Born in Wānaka, New Zealand, he won a bronze medal in the Big Air competition at Winter X Games XVI.

Wells's brothers Byron, Beau-James, and Jackson are also competitive freestyle skiers.

References

External links
 
 
 
 
 
 

1990 births
Living people
New Zealand male freestyle skiers
X Games athletes
Superpipe skiers
Freestyle skiers at the 2014 Winter Olympics
Olympic freestyle skiers of New Zealand
People from Wānaka